Ronald Halsey Stone (8 April 1913 – 4 September 2006) was an association football player who represented New Zealand at international level. Stone died in Christchurch on 4 September 2006 aged 93.

Stone played two official A-international matches for the New Zealand national team in 1933 against trans-Tasman neighbours Australia as part of a 13 match tour, the first a 4–6 loss on 17 June 1933, followed by a 2–4 loss on 24 June.

References

1913 births
2006 deaths
New Zealand association footballers
New Zealand international footballers
Burials at Avonhead Cemetery
Association footballers not categorized by position